The men's team foil was one of ten fencing events on the fencing at the 1996 Summer Olympics programme. It was the nineteenth appearance of the event. The competition was held on 25 July 1996. 34 fencers from 11 nations competed.

Brackets

Rosters

Austria - 4th place
 Benny Wendt
 Marco Falchetto
 Michael Ludwig

China - 9th place
 Ye Chong
 Dong Zhaozhi
 Wang Haibin

Cuba 
 Elvis Gregory
 Oscar García
 Rolando Tucker

Germany - 6th place
 Alexander Koch
 Uwe Römer
 Wolfgang Wienand

Hungary - 5th place
 Márk Marsi
 Róbert Kiss
 Zsolt Érsek

Italy - 8th place
 Alessandro Puccini
 Marco Arpino
 Stefano Cerioni

Poland 
 Adam Krzesiński
 Piotr Kiełpikowski
 Ryszard Sobczak
 Jarosław Rodzewicz

Russia 
 Dmitry Shevchenko
 Ilgar Mammadov
 Vladislav Pavlovich

South Korea - 7th place
 Jeong Su-Gi
 Kim Yong-Guk
 Kim Yeong-Ho

United States - 10th place
 Cliff Bayer
 Nick Bravin
 Peter Devine

Venezuela - 11th place
 Alfredo Pérez
 Carlos Rodríguez
 Rafael Suárez

References

Foil team
Men's events at the 1996 Summer Olympics